National Secondary Route 104, or just Route 104 (or ) is a National Road Route of Costa Rica, located in the San José province.

Description
It is the main road between the Mata Redonda district of San José canton, and Pavas canton. This road starts in the junction with Route 1 at the northeast corner of La Sabana Metropolitan Park, it is the north border road of the park.

In San José province the route covers San José canton (Mata Redonda, Pavas districts).

History
In 2019 there were works to widen the road from two to four lanes, two in each direction.

References

Highways in Costa Rica